Russia first participated at the World Games in 1993, after the dissolution of the Soviet Union in 1991. Previously, Russian athletes competed as part of the Soviet Union at the World Games 1989.

Medals by World Games

Medalists

The Hague 1993

Lahti 1997

Akita 2001

Duisburg 2005

 
Nations at the World Games